A Woman of Substance may refer to:

 A Woman of Substance (novel), a 1979 novel by Barbara Taylor Bradford
 A Woman of Substance (TV series), a 1984 British-American television series, based on the novel